Irregular Records is a British independent record label specialising in folk music, which was established in 1985 by the singer Robb Johnson.  In addition to Johnson's own recordings the label has also issued albums by artists such as Barb Jungr, Des de Moor, Maggie Holland and Russell Churney.

Releases to date
In the label's history there have been over a hundred releases to date.

References

See also
 List of record labels

Record labels established in 1985
British independent record labels
Folk record labels
1985 establishments in the United Kingdom